NCAA College Basketball 2K3 is an American college basketball video game which was initially released on December 2, 2002 for the Xbox, PlayStation 2 and GameCube. It is the only title in the series that uses the "College Basketball" designation rather than "College Hoops". It features former Duke Blue Devils guard Jay Williams on the cover.  

NCAA College Basketball 2K3 was the only title in the series to appear on the GameCube, as well as being the GameCube's only college basketball game. The GameCube version of the game was released in limited quantities, and it is now considered one of the rarest titles available for the system.

Features
ESPN Broadcast Presentation - Replays, scores, ESPN theme, ESPN commentators and More! All displayed in the great ESPN broadcast.
Over 300 Division I Schools - Accurate 2002 Division I rosters, ratings, and schedules for more than 300 college Schools.
Comprehensive Legacy Mode - Assemble your hoops program from the ground up and build a Division I dynasty that even Westwood would envy.
Player Editor - New player names appear on the backs of their jerseys.
Classic and Custom Tournaments - Compete in conference tournaments, the classic field of 64, or create your own custom tournaments from scratch.
Immersive College Atmosphere - Authentic college flavor complete with school-specific cheerleaders, chants, and fight songs. Roleplaying Mode—Play as one player the entire game.

Reception

The game was met with positive reception upon release.  GameRankings and Metacritic gave it a score of 84.59% and 84 out of 100 for the Xbox version; 83.05% and 83 out of 100 for the PlayStation 2 version; and 83% and 82 out of 100 for the GameCube version.

References

External links

2002 video games
College basketball video games in the United States
GameCube games
PlayStation 2 games
Sega video games
Video games developed in the United States
Xbox games
NCAA video games